Olwen Brookes (26 November 1901 – 17 September 1976) was an English actress, known for An Inspector Calls, The Happiest Days of Your Life and The First Night of Pygmalion. Her career spanned over a quarter of a century, and as well as stage work, included 29 films and 25 television appearances.

Filmography

 Men of Rochdale (Short) (1944) - Mrs. Clackman
 Caesar and Cleopatra (1945) - Slave Girl (uncredited)
 This Man Is Mine (1946) - Spinster (uncredited)
 The Mark of Cain (1947) - Mrs. Fisher (uncredited)
 My Sister and I (1948) - Mrs. Lippincott
 Warning to Wantons (1949) - (uncredited)
 Stop Press Girl (1949) - Hotel Receptionist (uncredited)
 Poet's Pub (1949) - Bridge Player (uncredited)
 Choir Practice (1949, TV film) - Mrs. Davies
 Trottie True (1949) - Lady Talman (uncredited)
 Obsession (1949) - 
 The Happiest Days of Your Life (1950) - Mrs. Parry
 Appointment with Venus (1951) - F.A.N.Y.
 Nocturne in Scotland (1951, TV film) - Princess Marceline Czartoyska
 Something Money Can't Buy (1952) - Lady at party
 Valley of Song (1953) - (uncredited)
 An Inspector Calls (1954) - Miss Francis
 The Black Knight (1954) - Lady Ontzlake
 Dixon of Dock Green (1955-1964, TV Series) -  Mrs. Randall / Mrs. Iver / Mrs. Ross / Mrs. Manton / Mrs. Welsh / Miss Braithwaite / Mrs. Cunningham
 The Gentle Touch (1956) - Other Sister
 Women Without Men (1956) - Hackett (uncredited)
 Life Without Lyons (1956, TV Series)
 High Terrace (1956) - Mother Superior
 Ivor Novello (1956, TV film)
 The Good Companions (1957) - Woman on Tram
 After the Ball (1957) - Housekeeper
 A Night to Remember (1958) - Miss Evans (uncredited)
 Jack the Ripper (1959) - Lady Almoner 
 Left Right and Centre (1959) - Right - Mrs. Samson
 Dancers in The Mourning (1959, TV series) - Miss Finbrough
 Don't Do It Dempsey (1960, TV Series) - Miss Twine
 Whack-O! (1960, TV Series) - Secretary
 Emergency – Ward 10 (1960, TV Series) - Mrs. Gregory
 The Citadel (1960, TV Mini-Series) - Mrs. Morgan Senior
 Jango (1961, TV Series) - Mrs. Bellew
 ITV Play of the Week (1961, TV Series) - Mrs. Watkins
 The Six Pound Walkers (1961, TV Series) - Mrs. Tindall
 Twice Round the Daffodils (1962) - Dorothy's mother
 Tales of Mystery (1962, TV Series) - Mrs. Peters
 Young and Willing (1962) - Miss Potter (uncredited)
 No Hiding Place (1962-1963, TV Series) - Mrs. Pike / Women's prison officer
 Ghost Squad (1963, TV Series) - Miss Reeves
 80,000 Suspects (1963) - Senior Nursing Officer (uncredited)
 Taxi! (1963-1964, TV Series) - Mrs. Stephens / Hotel Receptionist
 The Wednesday Play (1965, TV Series) - Woman at the races
 Devils of Darkness (1965) - Landlady
 Compact (1965, TV Series) - Mrs. Bunny
 The Forsyte Saga (1967, TV Mini-Series) - Bilson
 Honey Lane (1967, TV Series) - Customer
 Eye of the Devil (1967) - Party Guest (uncredited)
 Sexton Blake (1968, TV Series) - Miss Cranber
 The First Night of Pygmalion (1969, TV film) - Edith Lyttleton
 The Culture Vultures (1970, TV Series) - Dora
 On the Run (1971) - Miss Fisher (final film role)

References

External links

1901 births
1976 deaths
English stage actresses
English film actresses
English television actresses
20th-century English actresses